My Name Is Jermaine is the third solo album from Jermaine Jackson and the first post-Jackson 5 album from him.  It was released in 1976.  The single released from this album was "Let's Be Young Tonight" which went to  No. #19 on the Black Singles chart.

Reception

In 1975, The Jackson 5 released what would be their final album recorded for Motown, Moving Violation.  Tired of his sons not being able to write their own songs, Joseph Jackson devised an exit strategy from Motown.  Jermaine, however, remained with the label. With Jermaine gone, the youngest Jackson brother, Randy, joined the group and since the "Jackson 5" trademark was owned by Motown, the brothers renamed themselves The Jacksons and moved to Epic Records where they scored more hits like "Enjoy Yourself", "Shake Your Body (Down to the Ground)", "This Place Hotel", and many more. Jermaine would not join his brothers again until the Motown 25 TV special in 1983.

For Jermaine's first album without his brothers, Berry Gordy hired a who's-who of Motown producers, including Hal Davis (who was instrumental in part of the brothers' success) and Jeffrey Bowen.

Track listing
Side A
"Let's Be Young Tonight" (Don Daniels, Michael L. Smith) - 5:50
"Faithful" (featuring Thelma Houston) (Don Daniels, Michael L. Smith) - 5:14
"Look Past My Life" (Terri McFaddin, Greg Wright) - 3:21
"Bass Odyssey" (Greg Wright) - 3:27

Side B
"Who's That Lady" (Kenneth Lupper, Hubert Heard) - 4:07
"Lovely You're the One" (Jeffrey Bowen, Truman Thomas, James Henry Ford) - 4:04
"Stay With Me" (Michael B. Sutton, Brenda Sutton) - 2:51
"I Just Want to Take This Time" (Eric Robinson, Victor Orsborn) - 4:31
"My Touch of Madness" (Michael L. Smith) - 4:56

Personnel
Technical
Berry Gordy - executive producer
Michael L. Smith, Greg Wright, Clay Drayton, Kenneth Lupper, William Bickelhaupt, Truman Thomas, Arthur G. Wright, William Goldstein - arrangements
Harry Langdon - cover photography

Charts

Singles

References

External links
 Jermaine Jackson-My Name Is Jermaine at Discogs

1976 albums
Jermaine Jackson albums
Albums produced by Hal Davis
Albums produced by Jeffrey Bowen
Motown albums
Soul albums by American artists